The 35th Karlovy Vary International Film Festival took place from 5 to 15 July 2000. The Crystal Globe was won by Me You Them, a Brazilian drama film directed by Andrucha Waddington. The second prize, the Special Jury Prize was won ex aequo by The Big Animal, a Polish comedy-drama film directed by Jerzy Stuhr, and by Peppermint Candy, a South Korean drama film directed by Lee Chang-dong.  Iranian film director, screenwriter, poet, photographer and film producer Abbas Kiarostami was the president of the jury.

Juries
The following people formed the juries of the festival: 
Main competition
 Abbas Kiarostami, Jury President (Iran)
 Icíar Bollaínová (Spain)
 Saša Gedeon (Czech Republic)
 Arik Kaplun (Israel)
 Srđan Karanović (Yugoslavia)
 Fred Roos (UK)
 Jermek Šinarbajev (Kazakhstan)
 Dana Vávrová (Germany)
Documentaries
 Richard Leacock, president (UK)
 Morando Morandini (Italy)
 Kristina Stojanová (Canada)
 Milos Stehlik (USA)
 Miroljub Vučkovič (Jugoslavia)

Official selection awards
The following feature films and people received the official selection awards:
 Crystal Globe (Grand Prix) - Me You Them (Eu tu eles) by Andrucha Waddington (Brazil)
 Special Jury Prize (ex aequo)
 The Big Animal (Duze zwirze) by Jerzy Stuhr (Poland)
 Peppermint Candy (Bakha satang) by Lee Chang-dong (South Korea)
 Best Director Award - Vinko Brešan for Marshal Tito's Spirit (Maršal) (Croatia)
 Best Actress Award - Regina Casé for her role in Me You Them (Et tu eles) (Brazil)
 Best Actor Award(ex aequo)
 Ian Hart for his role in Aberdeen (UK, Norway, Sweden)
 Hamid Farokhnezad for his role in The Bride of Fire (Arous-e atash) (Iran)
 Special Jury Mention - A Question of Taste (Une affaire de goût) by Bernard Rapp (France) & Angels of the Universe (Englar alheimsins) by Friðrik Þór Friðriksson (Iceland)

Other statutory awards
Other statutory awards that were conferred at the festival:
 Best documentary film (over 30 min.) - My Mother Had Fourteen Children (Min mamma hade fjorton barn) by Lars Lennart Forsberg (Sweden)
 Special Jury Mention - The Sentence: The Accusation (Prisadata-Obvineniento) by Anna Petkova (Bulgaria) & Fighter by Amir Bar-Lev (USA, Czech Republic, Italy, Slovenia)
 Best documentary film (under 30 min.) - Part of the World That Belongs to You (Del av den värld som är din) by Karin Wegsjö (Sweden)
 Crystal Globe for Outstanding Artistic Contribution to World Cinema - Věra Chytilová (Czech Republic), Carlos Saura (Spain)
 Award of the Town of Karlovy Vary - Károly Makk (Hungary)
 Audience Award - Angela's Ashes by Alan Parker (UK, USA, Ireland)

Non-statutory awards
The following non-statutory awards were conferred at the festival:
 FIPRESCI International Critics Award: Angels of the Universe (Englar alheimsins) by Friðrik Þór Friðriksson (Iceland)
 Special Mention: Eeny Meeny (Ene bene) by Alice Nellis (Czech Republic)
 FICC - The Don Quixote Prize: Peppermint Candy (Bakha satang) by Lee Chang-dong (South Korea)
 Special Mention: The Bride of Fire (Arous-e atash) by Khosrow Sinai (Iran) & No Place to Go (Die Unberührbare) by Oskar Roehler
 Ecumenical Jury Award: The Big Animal (Duze zwirze) by Jerzy Stuhr (Poland)
 Special Mention: Long Night's Journey into Day by Deborah Hoffmann & Frances Reid (USA) & Paromitar Ek Din (en. House of Memories) by Aparna Sen (India)
 Philip Morris Film Award: Blonde Bride (Sari gyalin) by Yaver Rzayev (Azerbaijan)
 NETPAC Award: Yi Yi by Edward Yang (Taiwan, Japan)
 Special Mention: Peppermint Candy (Bakha satang) by Lee Chang-dong (South Korea)

References

2000 film awards
Karlovy Vary International Film Festival